Jacobs Holding AG is an investment firm based in Zürich  founded in 1994 by Klaus Johann Jacobs which developed from Jacobs Suchard AG.

Following the sale of 10.1% of Adecco in 2014, the focus is on the 50.1% stake in Barry Callebaut AG. In addition, the holding company has two companies in the UK and Argentina specializing in agribusiness.

In 2001 Klaus Jacobs surrendered his entire share of the business to the Jacobs Foundation, with an effective value of CHF 1.5 billion. The foundation is now the sole economic beneficiary of the business.

Andreas Jacobs was Executive Chairman from 2004 to 2015 and is still a Member of the Board. The co-presidents of the board are Nicolas and Philippe Jacobs, the other three members are Patrick Firmenich, Conrad Meyer and Renata Jacobs.  Patrick De Maeseneire is the Chief Executive.

It owns Newsells Park.

In May 2018 it was reportedly planning to buy Portman Dentalcare.

The investment firm's sole economic beneficiary is the Jacobs Foundation.

The firm acquired and became the majority owner of Cognita Schools in September 2018.

References

Companies based in Zürich
Investment companies of Switzerland